The 2002 Giro d'Italia was the 85th edition of the Giro d'Italia, one of cycling's Grand Tours. The Giro began in Groningen, the Netherlands, with a Prologue individual time trial on 11 May, and Stage 10 occurred on 22 May with a stage to Benevento. The race finished in Milan on 2 June.

Prologue
11 May 2002 — Groningen,  (ITT)

Stage 1
12 May 2002 — Groningen to Münster,

Stage 2
13 May 2002 — Cologne to Ans,

Stage 3
14 May 2002 — Verviers to Esch-sur-Alzette,

Stage 4
15 May 2002 — Esch-sur-Alzette to Strasbourg,

Rest day 1
16 May 2002

Stage 5
17 May 2002 — Fossano to Limone Piemonte,

Stage 6
18 May 2002 — Cuneo to Varazze,

Stage 7
19 May 2002 — Viareggio to Lido di Camaiore,

Stage 8
20 May 2002 — Capannori to Orvieto,

Stage 9
21 May 2002 — Tivoli to Caserta,

Stage 10
22 May 2002 — Maddaloni to Benevento,

References

2002 Giro d'Italia
Giro d'Italia stages